Nibbinda Forest Monastery is a Theravada forest monastery situated at Mukim 5, Balik Pulau, Penang, Malaysia. The monastery is located on top of a hill in Balik Pulau, surrounded by mountains and facing the sea.

History 
In the early of 2009, Nibbinda Forest Monastery was officially offered to and named by the Most Venerable Pa Auk Tawya Sayadaw. Nibbinda means “disgust with worldly life”. By leaving the hustle and bustle of the worldly life, monks will be able to learn and practise the Buddha’s teachings in a comfortable environment.

External links 
Official website

Theravada Buddhist monasteries
Buddhist monasteries in Asia
Pa-Auk Society
Southwest Penang Island District
Religious buildings and structures in Penang
Buildings and structures in George Town, Penang
Chinese-Malaysian culture
Religious buildings and structures completed in 2009
21st-century Buddhist temples